PNS Shamsheer (FFG-252) is the second F-22P Zulfiquar-class guided missile frigate currently in active service with the Pakistan Navy since her commissioning in 2009.

Operational history

Shamsheers steel cutting was held at the Hudong–Zhonghua Shipbuilding in Shanghai, China on 13 July 2007– the official date of her keel laying. She was officially launched on 31 October 2008, completing a number of sea trials in China. On 19 December 2009, she was commissioned in the Pakistan Navy in China, with Adm. Numan Bashir, then-Chief of Naval Staff (CNS), sponsoring and overseeing the commissioning of the ship from China.

She is the namesake of Shamsheer, which means Sword and is a special type of sabre with a 5–15° curve from top to tip. Upon commissioning, she embarked on a long journey from Shanghai, China to Karachi, Sindh, and later paying a four-day state visit to Port of Colombo in Sri Lanka.

On 23 January 2010, Shamsheer reported to her home base, Naval Base Karachi. Upon her arrival at the Naval Base, a celebrating reception was held at the deck of the Shamsheer, attended by Chinese Vice Admiral Tian Zhong and Vice-Admiral Asif Sandila, Vice Chief of Naval Staff.

In 2015, Shamsheer was deployed in the Indian Ocean where she was deployed in Yemen to participate in evacuating the foreign and Pakistani nationals from Yemen after the civil war ensued.

As of 2019, Shamsheer is deployed in Persian Gulf as part of the regional maritime security patrol, paying visits in Oman, Bahrain, and Iran. In March 2022, a flotilla of Pakistan Navy warships including Shamsheer visited the Doha International Maritime Defence Exhibition and Conference (DIMDEX 2022) at Hamad port, organized by Qatar Armed Forces.

In October 2022, two personnel were injured while working at the forecastle after Shamsheer entered rough seas while en route to South Korea before attending the annual Japanese fleet review. The ship sent a Distress signal to the Philippines after which it anchored at Santa Ana port from where NOLCOM forces transported the injured personnel to a Hospital.

References

F-22P Zulfiquar-class frigate
2008 ships
Ships built in China